England Korfball Association, also simply known as the EKA, is the governing body for the sport of Korfball in England. Before 2006 known as the British Korfball Association (BKA), it is the Korfball association responsible for overseeing all aspects of the game in its territory.

England/British Korfball Presidents / Chairs 
Entries in Bold are designated as Head of the Organisation.

Presidents
 1946/48 – Alderman J Clark
 1948/51 – Mr C. H. Walbancke
 1951/52 – Mr J. W. Yapp
 1952 – J.R.T Hadley
 1952/69 - Tbc
 1969/75 - Ray E. Thorpe
 1976 - Michael Renew (tbc)
 1976/82 - Tbc
 1982/88 – Geoff Carter
 1988 - Philip Buttinger*** 
Chairpersons*
 1975 - Peter Allan (tbc)
 1975 - Michael Renew (tbc)
 1975/82 - Tbc
 1982/83 - Jan Buttinger
 1983/88 - Graham Crafter*
 1988/90 - Geoff Carter (previously president)*
 1990/91 - Peter Burt (July 1990 1 month), Max Buttinger (August 1990)
 1991/93 - Nigel Etheridge
 1993/98 - Terry Daniels**
 1998/00 – Max Buttinger*
 2000/05 - Peter Allan (resigned October 2005)*
 2005/06 - Anna Janes (Acting Chair from October 2005)*
 2006/07 - Corrine Buckland*
 2007/08 - David Hubbard*
 2008/11 - Anna Jeanes*
 2011/12 - Nick Donovan*
 2012/18 - Craig Gosling*
2018 to Present - Ellen Pearce
*Source - BKA/EKA Newsletter/AGM Minutes

** Source - BKA/IKF Documentation showing chair 1993/94, 1996/97

***1988 - President became an Honorary Position

Lifetime President
 1988 - Philip Buttinger Snr

Volunteer Achievements

The Jan Hanekroot Award - Lifetime Achievement
 2005 - Graham Crafter
 2009 - Steve Barker
 2014 - Sam Wells
 2015 - Jackie and David Hubbard

Marion Atkinson Award of Honour 

 1985 - Philip Buttinger
 1886 - Jill & Terry Sage
 1987 - Peter Allan
 1988 - E & A Williamson
 1989 - P & J Burt
 1990 - G & J Carter
 1991 - E Renew
 1993 - Graham & Valerie Crafter
 1994 - Jan Hanekroot
 1995 - Paul Brooks
 1996 - Stephen Barker
 1998 - Alan Burrows
 2001 - Jon Herbert
 2003 - Jackie Hubbard
 2005 - Frank Sieber
 2006 - Kevin Allen
 2009 - Peter Teague
 2011 - David Bond
 2014 - Nicky Bedford

Graham Crafter Award of Distinction 
 2005 - Dom McDonald
 2006 - Kathy Shaw
 2009 - Lee Matthews
 2011 - Katie Ellis
 2014 - Dean Woods

National League Winners
Official List
 2016/17- Trojans
 2015/16 - Trojans
 2014/15 - Trojans
 2013/14 - Trojans
 2012/13 - Trojans
 2011/12 - Trojans
 2010/11 - Trojans
 2009/10 - Trojans
 2008/09 - Trojans
 2007/08 - Trojans
 2006/07 - Mitcham
 2005/06 - Invicta
 2004/05 - Mitcham
 2003/04 - Invicta
 2002/03 - Invicta
 2001/02 - Mitcham
 2000/01 - Mitcham
 1999/00 - Mitcham
 1998/99 - Mitcham
 1997/98 - Mitcham
 1996/97 - Croydon
 1995/96 - Mitcham
 1994/95 - Mitcham
 1993/94 - Vultrix
 1992/93 - Nomads
 1991/92 - Mitcham
 1990/91 - Vultrix
 1989/90 - Mitcham
 1988/89 - Mitcham
 1987/88 - Mitcham

Unofficial

 1987/88 - Mitcham
 1986/87 - 
 1985/86 - Mitcham
 1984/85 - 
 1983/84 - 
 1982/83 - 
 1981/82 -
 1980/81 - 
 1979/80 - 
 1978/79 - Mitcham
 1977/78 - 
 1976/77 - 
 1975/76 - 
 1974/75 - 
 1973/74 - 
 1972/73 - 
 1971/72 - Mitcham
 1970/71 - Mitcham
 1969/70 - Mitcham
 1968/69 - Mitcham
 1967/68 - Mitcham
 1966/67 - Mitcham

National Cup Winners
 1958	 Mitcham
 1959	 Mitcham
 1960	 Wandsworth
 1961	 Mitcham
 1962	 Bec
 1963	 Mitcham
 1964	 Mitcham
 1965	 Pegasus
 1966	 Bec
 1967	 Bec
 1968	 Pegasus
 1969	 Mitcham
 1970	 Mitcham
 1971	 Bec
 1972	 Mitcham
 1973	 Vultrix
 1974	 Bec
 1975	 Vultrix
 1976	 Vultrix
 1977	 Vultrix
 1978	 Vultrix
 1979	 Vultrix
 1980	 Mitcham
 1981	 Vultrix
 1982	 Vultrix
 1983	 Crystal Palace
 1984	 Crystal Palace
 1985	 Crystal Palace
 1986	 Mitcham
 1987	 Mitcham
 1988	 Mitcham
 1989	 Crystal Palace
 1990	 Mitcham
 1991	 Mitcham
 1992	 Mitcham
 1993	 Vultrix
 1994	 Mitcham
 1995	 Mitcham
 1996	 Croydon
 1997	 Mitcham
 1998	 Mitcham
 1999	 Mitcham
 2000	 Nomads
 2001	 Croydon
 2002	 Invicta
 2003	 Invicta
 2004	 Invicta
 2005	 Invicta
 2006	 Mitcham
 2007	 Trojans
 2008	 Trojans
 2009	 Trojans
 2010	 Trojans 2
 2011	 Nottingham

See also
England national korfball team

References

Korfball
Korfball in England
Korfball governing bodies